Ian Henderson (born July 16, 1980) is an American stock car racing driver. Henderson last competed part-time in the NASCAR Busch Series for Jimmy Means Racing. Henderson has also competed in ARCA and the NASCAR K&N Pro Series East.

Motorsports career results

NASCAR
(key) (Bold – Pole position awarded by qualifying time. Italics – Pole position earned by points standings or practice time. * – Most laps led.)

Busch Series

Camping World East Series

ARCA Re/Max Series
(key) (Bold – Pole position awarded by qualifying time. Italics – Pole position earned by points standings or practice time. * – Most laps led.)

References

External links
 

NASCAR drivers
ARCA Menards Series drivers
Living people
1980 births
People from Piedmont, South Carolina
Racing drivers from South Carolina